Lisa Sutton may refer to:
 Lisa Song Sutton, Asian-American entrepreneur
 Lisa L. Sutton, Washington Court of Appeals judge